The 4 Pines Brewing Company is an Australian craft brewery and hospitality business based on the Northern Beaches of Sydney.

First established in 2008 as a 5hL brewpub in Manly, New South Wales the company opened a new brewing facility in Brookvale in 2011 with a 50hL brewhouse, bottling line, and bar.

In 2017, 4 Pines Brewing Company was purchased by AB InBev through its venture capital arm, ZX Ventures. This allowed the company to use the brewing and distribution network of Carlton & United Breweries (CUB) which was acquired by AB InBev in 2016.

In 2019, CUB confirmed that 4 Pines Brewing Company would be included in the sale of CUB to Asahi Breweries.

In addition to its wholesale brewing activities, 4 Pines has a significant hospitality business. As of August 2020 there are a total of ten permanent 4 Pines branded bars across New South Wales, Victoria, and Queensland in addition to pop-up bars at Docklands Stadium and the Sydney Cricket Ground.

4 Pines Brewing Company releases 'Ready to drink' alcoholic beverages under its 'Brookvale Union' brand.

Notable Achievements
In 2010 the company, in partnership with space engineering firm, Saber Astronautics Australia, worked on developing the first space-certified beer.

At the inaugural Craft Beer Industry Awards in 2014 4 Pines Brewing Company and Two Birds Brewing were named joint winners of the 'Bintani Champion Large Brewery Award', with the company also winning the 'Champion Pale Ale' for its ESB.
 
In 2015 4 Pines Brewing Company won the 'GrainCorp Trophy for Champion Large Australian Brewery' at the Australian International Beer Awards (AIBA).

Products

Core Range Beers
 Draught - a German style golden ale (4.6% alc/vol)
 Hefeweizen - a German style wheat beer (5.2% alc/vol) 
 Pale Ale - an American style Pale Ale (5.1% alc/vol) 
 Amber Ale - an American style amber ale (5.1% alc/vol)
 Indian Summer Ale - an Australian style pale ale (4.2% alc/vol)
 Pacific Ale - A mid-strength pale ale (3.5% alc/vol)
 Extra Refreshing Ale - a dry, easy drinking pale ale with all Australian ingredients (4.1% alc/vol) 
 Nitro Stout - a dry Irish stout infused with nitrogen gas (5.1% alc/vol)

Brookvale Union
 Ginger Beer (4.0% alc/vol)
 Spiced Rum Ginger Beer with lime (4.0% alc/vol)
 Vodka and Peach Iced Tea (4.0% alc/vol)
 Vodka Lemon Lime and Bitters (4.0% alc/vol)
 Boozy Seltzer - Grapefruit; Lime and Orange Bitters (4.0% alc/vol)

See also

Australian pub
Beer in Australia
List of breweries in Australia

References

Bibliography

External links 
 

Australian beer brands
Australian companies established in 2008
Beer brewing companies based in New South Wales
Food and drink companies established in 2008
Food and drink companies based in Sydney
Manufacturing companies based in Sydney
Manly, New South Wales
AB InBev brands
Asahi Breweries
Certified B Corporations in the Food & Beverage Industry
B Lab-certified corporations in Australia